Williams Township is an inactive township in Wayne County, in the U.S. state of Missouri.

Williams Township was erected in 1872, taking its name from William Williams, a pioneer citizen.

References

Townships in Missouri
Townships in Wayne County, Missouri